The following is a list of songs recorded by Chris Cornell. It features songs on which Cornell is credited as an individual artist, either lead or featured; songs by his bands Soundgarden, Temple of the Dog and Audioslave are not included on this list.

Chris Cornell was an American rock musician from Seattle, Washington. He began his career in 1984 when he co-founded the grunge band Soundgarden, and later performed with Temple of the Dog from 1990 to 1992. In 1992, Cornell released his first solo EP Poncier and contributed the song "Seasons" to the Singles soundtrack, which also featured the track "Birth Ritual" by Soundgarden. He also collaborated with Alice in Chains and Mark Arm (as "Alice Mudgarden") on "Right Turn" for the EP Sap. After Soundgarden split up in 1997, Cornell made a number of guest appearances for artists including Alice Cooper and Ramones, before releasing his debut solo album Euphoria Morning in 1999, which featured a number of songs co-written by Eleven members Alain Johannes and Natasha Shneider. From 2001 to 2007, he worked with former Rage Against the Machine members Tom Morello, Tim Commerford and Brad Wilk as part of Audioslave, who released three studio albums together.

Cornell released his second solo album Carry On in 2007, preceded by the previous year's single "You Know My Name" which was featured as the main theme tune of the James Bond film Casino Royale. The album was written entirely by the singer, with the exception of the cover version of Michael Jackson's "Billie Jean". The follow-up, 2009's Scream, was co-written with a number of hip hop and R&B producers, including Timbaland, J-Roc and Ryan Tedder, and marked a drastic change in direction for Cornell. In 2010, the singer was featured on songs by Slash, Gabin and Santana, before Soundgarden reunited for the 2012 album King Animal. In his final years Cornell focused on his solo career, releasing a number of singles as well as his fourth and final solo studio album Higher Truth. He died by suicide on May 18, 2017.

Songs

See also
Audioslave discography
Soundgarden discography

Footnotes

References

Cornell, Chris